was a Japanese sports official.

He hailed from Chiba Prefecture. He was an active shot putter in his younger days, and became Japanese champion in 1938. He was president of the Japanese Olympic Committee from 1969 to 1973 and the Japan Association of Athletics Federations from 1975 to 1999, and vice president of the International Association of Athletics Federations from 1991 to 1999. At stepping down he was titled as honorary life vice president.

He was decorated with the Olympic Order in silver in 1985, the Order of the Sacred Treasure in 1986 and the IAAF Golden Order of Merit in 2007. Since 1988 he was an honorary citizen of Tokyo. He died from heart failure in 2010.

References

|-
 

|-

1915 births
2010 deaths
Sportspeople from Chiba Prefecture
Japanese male shot putters
Japanese referees and umpires
Recipients of the Order of the Sacred Treasure
Recipients of the Olympic Order
Japan Championships in Athletics winners
20th-century Japanese people